Mount Romulus is a  mountain summit located in the Little Elbow River Valley of Kananaskis Country in the Canadian Rockies of Alberta, Canada. Weather permitting, the peak is visible from highways southwest of Calgary as it is recognizable by its signature band of snow that forms above the broad southeast cliffs. The mountain is named for Romulus, who along with his twin brother Remus were the mythological founders of Ancient Rome. The name was officially adopted by the Geographical Names Board of Canada in 1940. Mount Romulus' nearest higher peak is Fisher Peak,  to the northwest.

Geology
Mount Romulus is composed of sedimentary rock laid down during the Precambrian to Jurassic periods. Formed in shallow seas, this sedimentary rock was pushed east and over the top of younger rock during the Laramide orogeny.

Climate
Based on the Köppen climate classification, Mount Romulus is located in a subarctic climate zone with cold, snowy winters, and mild summers. Precipitation runoff from the mountain drains into the Little Elbow River, which is a tributary of the Elbow River.

See also

List of mountains of Canada
Geology of Alberta
Scrambles in the Canadian Rockies

References

External links
 Mount Romulus weather web site: Mountain Forecast

Two-thousanders of Alberta
Canadian Rockies
Alberta's Rockies